Richard Worsfold (born 17 July 1964) is a British Anglican priest. Since 2018, he has served as Archdeacon of Leicester in the Church of England's Diocese of Leicester.

Worsfold was educated at the University of Exeter and Cranmer Hall, Durham. He was ordained in the Church of England as a deacon in 1995 and as a priest in 1996. He served his title at Countesthorpe between 1995 and 1999. He then served incumbencies at Bradgate Team Parish and Westcotes. He was the Area Dean of Leicester from 2014 to 2018 before his appointment as Archdeacon.

References

1964 births
Living people
Archdeacons of Leicester
21st-century English Anglican priests
20th-century English Anglican priests
Alumni of the University of Exeter
Alumni of Cranmer Hall, Durham